The Sony Cyber-shot DSC-HX20V is a hyperzoom camera that was released in 2012.

Features 
Features of the camera include:
 Wide-angle lens
 18.9 megapixel resolution
 Optical image stabilizer in the lens, reducing blurring by compensating for hand shake—10 fps continuous shooting
 20x optical zoom range
 1 cm minimum focusing distance
 Full HD 1080p movie mode in both normal and wide aspect ratio
 Panorama Still Image Size : Sweep Panorama:HR(10,480 x 4,096) / Wide(7,152 x 1,080/4,912 x 1,920) / Standard(4,912 x 1,080/3,424 x 1,920)
 Optical SteadyShot™ with 3-way Active Mode Image Stabilization
 Background Defocus
 AVCHD 60i:28M PS(1,920×1,080/60p)/24M FX/17M FH(1,920×1,080/60i)/9M HQ(1,440×1,080/60i),MP4:12M(1,440×1,080/30fps)/6M(1,280×720/30fps)/3M VGA(640×480/30fps)
 Dust + push- sensitive objective

Photo gallery

Camera

External links

 Data sheet
 Official Promo- video

References 

HX20
Superzoom cameras
Digital cameras with CMOS image sensor